Jan Matocha (5 January 1923 – 11 October 2016) was a Czechoslovak sprint canoer who competed in the late 1940s and early 1950s. Competing in two Summer Olympics, he finished ninth in the K-1 10000 m event at London in 1948. He was born in Střelná.

References
Jan Matocha's profile at Sports Reference.com

1923 births
2016 deaths
Canoeists at the 1948 Summer Olympics
Canoeists at the 1952 Summer Olympics
Czechoslovak male canoeists
Olympic canoeists of Czechoslovakia